Ahmed Adam Ahmed Muhamed (born 1 September 1994), commonly known as Ahmed Bibo is a Sudanese professional footballer who plays as a defender for Al-Merrikh SC and the Sudan national football team.

References 
 

Living people
1994 births
Sudanese footballers
Sudan international footballers
Association football defenders
Al-Merrikh SC players
Sudan A' international footballers
2022 African Nations Championship players